Inked in Blood was an American Christian metalcore and melodic hardcore group. They come from Portland, Oregon. The band started making music in 2001 and disbanded in 2007. Their first show was December 2001 in Portland, OR with Knives Out. The band released two demos, one extended play, Awakening Vesuvius, in 2004. Their first studio album, Lay Waste the Poets, was released by Facedown Records, in 2005. The subsequent studio album, Sometimes We Are Beautiful, was released by Facedown Records, in 2007, as their final recording.

Background
Inked in Blood Christian hardcore and Christian metal band from Portland, Oregon. Their final line up was vocalist Joey Trump, guitarists Matt McDonnell and Kelly Mullinix, bassist Steven Gosvener, and drummer Stephen Poole.

Music history
The band commenced as a musical entity in 2001. Their first release, Awakening Vesuvius, an extended play, was released on June 1, 2004. Some sources claim Awakening Vesuvius was released  by Rainstorm Productions and re issued by Strike First Records or Strike First Records. They released a studio album, Lay Waste the Poets, on November 8, 2005 with Facedown Records. Their second studio album, Sometimes We Are Beautiful, was released by Facedown Records on October 2, 2007.

Members
Final line-up
 Joey Trump - vocals
 Matt McDonnell - guitar
 Steven Gosvener - bass
 Kelly Mullinix - guitar, vocals
 Stephen Poole - drums (formerly of Society's Finest)

Discography

Studio albums
 Lay Waste the Poets (November 8, 2005, Facedown)
 Sometimes We Are Beautiful (October 2, 2007, Facedown)

Extended plays
 Awakening Vesuvius (2004, Strike First)

References

External links
 Facebook page
 Cross Rhythms artist profile

Musical groups from Portland, Oregon
2004 establishments in Oregon
2007 disestablishments in Oregon
Musical groups established in 2004
Musical groups disestablished in 2007
Facedown Records artists